Jordan James (born 24 May 1980) is a former Wales international rugby league footballer who played as a  in the 2000s and 2010s.

He played for in the Super League for the Wigan Warriors (Heritage № 990), Crusaders RL along with the South Wales Scorpions, the Swinton Lions, the Widnes Vikings, the Castleford Tigers (Heritage № 830), the Sheffield Eagles and the Salford City Reds.

James is a former Royal Marine of 42 Commando who served with the marines in Iraq and was awarded the King's Badge during his Marines training and played his amateur rugby league with Gloucestershire Warriors.

After retiring from playing, James has gone on to have a successful career coaching and inspiring younger Wigan Warriors' players.

Background
James was born in Bath, Avon, England.

International honours
James has been captain numerous times for Wales while at Salford, Sheffield, Castleford, Widnes and Celtic Crusaders.

He was named in the Wales squad to face England at the Keepmoat Stadium, Doncaster prior to England's departure for the 2008 Rugby League World Cup.

He was named Wales' player of the year for 2009.

In 2010 he represented Wales again in the 2010 Alitalia European Cup.

He represented Wales in the 2011 Four Nations.

He represented Wales in the 2013 Rugby League World Cup.

Personal life
He appeared in the fourth series of the ITV dating show Take Me Out, which aired on 1 December 2012. He got a date with Victoria after becoming the first person in the history of the show to still have all 30 lights left on in the final round.

References

External links
 (archived by web.archive.org) Salford City Reds Profile
 (archived by web.archive.org) Widnes Profile
 (archived by web.archive.org) King's Badge
 (archived by web.archive.org) Warriors Sign Jordan James
 (archived by web.archive.org) Statistics at thecastlefordtigers.co.uk

1980 births
Living people
21st-century Royal Marines personnel
Castleford Tigers players
Crusaders Rugby League players
English people of Welsh descent
English rugby league coaches
Royal Marines ranks
Rugby league props
Rugby league second-rows
Salford Red Devils players
Sheffield Eagles players
South Wales Scorpions players
Swinton Lions players
Wales national rugby league team captains
Wales national rugby league team players
Widnes Vikings players
Wigan Warriors players
Workington Town players